Habenaria batesii is a species of plant in the family Orchidaceae. It is endemic to Cameroon. Its natural habitat is subtropical or tropical moist lowland forests. It is threatened by habitat loss.

References

Endemic orchids of Cameroon
batesii
Endangered plants
Taxonomy articles created by Polbot